"7 Years" is a song by Danish soul-pop band Lukas Graham from their second studio album, Lukas Graham. The song was released as a digital download on 18 September 2015 by Copenhagen Records. The lyric video was uploaded to YouTube on 17 November 2015, and the music video was uploaded on 15 December 2015. It has since garnered over 1 billion views on YouTube.

Despite receiving mixed reviews from music critics, "7 Years" topped the Danish Singles Chart. Outside Denmark, the singles topped the charts in Australia, Austria, Canada, Italy, New Zealand, the Republic of Ireland, Sweden, and the United Kingdom, while peaking within the top ten of the charts in many other European countries and the United States. The song was written by Lukas Forchhammer, Stefan Forrest, Morten Ristorp, and Morten "Pilo" Pilegaard. The song was produced by Stefan Forrest and Morten Ristorp under their stage name Future Animals, and Pilegaard. The song was mixed by Delbert Bowers and Morten Pilegaard.

On 12 February 2017, "7 Years" was nominated for three Grammy Awards: Record of the Year, Song of the Year, and Best Pop Duo/Group Performance. According to the International Federation of the Phonographic Industry (IFPI), "7 Years" was the seventh best-selling song of 2016 worldwide with 10.4 million digital downloads and track-equivalent streams.

Background
Frontman Lukas Forchhammer described "7 Years" as a song that summarises his life so far and what he hopes to achieve in the future. He continued: "It's a song about growing older. I'm also coming to a realisation that being a father is the most important thing. My biggest dream is not to be some negative old dude, but to have my kids' friends say, 'You're going to visit your dad? Say hi! He's awesome.' I had a perfect father."

Regarding the band's prior failure to break into the international market, Forchhammer stated, "It's like my father died at exactly the right moment – and I know that's something I shouldn't say, but I just did! If my dad hadn't died in 2012 I wouldn't have written our song 'Happy Home', which catapulted us into a Scandinavian success story. I wouldn't have written '7 Years', which got us signed to a publisher in America and ultimately signed to Warner Bros."

Composition
"7 Years" is a soul-pop song with hip hop influences, written in the key of G minor with a chord progression of Gm-Bb-Eb-F. It runs at 130 bpm. It is accompanied by a mid-tempo piano line, a percussion backbeat, slideshow projector incorporations, and a synthesized string section.

Critical reception
"7 Years" received mixed reviews from critics. Danish newspaper Jyllands-Posten critic Anders Houmøller Thomsen compared the song to the Beatles' "When I'm Sixty-Four": " '7 Years' bubbles with ignited storytelling about life's fast speed, when the daydreams of childhood and youth suddenly becomes replaced by retirement-melancholia. Graham finds his own path between sweet sentimentality and heartbreaking empathy, and like a young McCartney, Graham also has a similar instinctive ability to craft superglue-sticking choruses."

However, Time magazine named "7 Years" one of the Top 10 Worst Songs of 2016, saying, "Good luck explaining the meteoric popularity of this (yes, catchy) chewy contemporary pop-rock ballad, which makes a listener yearn for the artistic integrity of a band like Maroon 5."

Chart performance
For the issue dated 6 February 2016, "7 Years" debuted at number 96 on the US Billboard Hot 100 chart. It became Lukas Graham's first single on the Hot 100. The song peaked at number two on the chart dated 9 April 2016, and became the highest-charting Danish act since "Apache" (1961) by Jørgen Ingmann. The song stayed there for four non-consecutive weeks, being held off of the top spot by Rihanna and Drake's "Work" and Desiigner's "Panda". "7 Years" also debuted at number 28 on the US Digital Songs chart with 26,000 digital copies sold. During 2016, the song sold 2.089 million copies in the US, making it the fourth best-selling song of the year. "7 Years" was biggest hit in the US by a foreign-born act since Gotye's "Somebody That I Used to Know" in 2012.

On 12 February 2016, "7 Years" peaked at number one on the UK Singles Chart, with combined weekly sales of 105,000 units (including 3.65 million streams). The song became the first number-one single by a Danish act since Aqua's "Turn Back Time" (1998). On 11 March 2016, "7 Years" spent its fifth consecutive week at number-one, becoming the longest-running number-one single by a Danish act. On 18 March 2016, "7 Years" was replaced by Mike Posner's "I Took a Pill in Ibiza" at number one, selling 261 copies fewer than Posner.  It was the best-selling song in the UK in 2016 with 856,559 copies sold that year, although as it had fewer streams than Drake's "One Dance", which gave "7 Years" a combined total 1.49 million units against "One Dance"'s 1.95 million, it was ranked number 2 on the chart.

"7 Years" peaked at number one on the Australian Singles Chart, which makes Lukas Graham only the third Danish act to chart at number one (since Cut 'N' Move's "Give It Up", and Aqua's "Barbie Girl" and "Doctor Jones"). On the chart issue dated 11 April 2016, "7 Years" spent its eighth consecutive week at number one, becoming the longest-running number-one single by a Danish act. It overtook the previous record set by Aqua's "Doctor Jones", which spent seven consecutive weeks at number one in 1997–98.

Music video

A music video to accompany the release of "7 Years" was first released on YouTube on 15 December 2015 at a total length of four minutes. 
The video is written, directed, and edited by Danish Film Director René Sascha Johannsen and the music video was recorded in Copenhagen, and Los Angeles. As of October 2022, it has received over 1.3 billion views on YouTube.

Cover versions
British singer Jasmine Thompson released a cover version of the song on 22 April 2016 through Atlantic Records. 

On 24 April 2016, Dutch singer Jan Versteegh released a cover version of the song through 8Ball Music, which was later included on his debut album, It Takes Swing, which was released on 13 May 2016. 

British singer Conor Maynard covered the song on the album Covers, which was released on 5 August 2016 by Parlophone. 

Linkin' Bridge, an American musical group from Louisville, Kentucky, covered the song during the semi-finals of NBC's America's Got Talent season 11 on 14 September 2016.

Track listing

Charts

Weekly charts

Year-end charts

Decade-end charts

Certifications

Release history

References

2015 songs
2015 singles
Songs written by Morten Ristorp
Songs written by Lukas Forchhammer
Songs written by Stefan Forrest
2010s ballads
Lukas Graham songs
Pop ballads
Songs about childhood
Songs about loneliness
Songs about nostalgia
Songs about old age
Songs inspired by deaths
Number-one singles in Austria
Number-one singles in Australia
Ultratop 50 Singles (Flanders) number-one singles
Canadian Hot 100 number-one singles
Number-one singles in Denmark
Number-one singles in Iceland
Irish Singles Chart number-one singles
Number-one singles in Italy
Dutch Top 40 number-one singles
Number-one singles in New Zealand
Number-one singles in Scotland
Number-one singles in Sweden
UK Singles Chart number-one singles
Black-and-white music videos
Warner Records singles
Copenhagen Records singles